Hasso Spode (born 1951 in Friedrichshagen) is a German historian and sociologist.

After his childhood in East Germany, Spode fled to West Berlin where he studied philosophy, history, theology, and sociology. He is professor in Hanover and director of the Historical Archive on Tourism at the Technical University in Berlin. The main focus of his research is on historical anthropology and cultural history, but he also works in the field of social and political history. He wrote over 200 articles, mostly in German, sometimes in English (translations in Czech, Greek, Romanian, Spanish, French, Danish, Italian, Japanese, Estonian, Russian), and wrote or edited more than a dozen books. He is co-editor of Annals of Tourism Research, Voyage. Studies on Travel & Tourism, and other journals. He is a member of the executive council of the Chinese Center of Drug Policy Studies and the Alcohol and Drugs History Society; until 2015 he was vice-president of the Tourism Committee of the International Sociological Association.

In the 1980s Spode analysed the Nazi leisure time organization Strength Through Joy as an important means of social politics in the Third Reich. In 1989 he launched the "study-group for tourism history", the first institution of this kind; in 1991 he published the worldwide first omnibus book in this field of research. Meanwhile, he is a noted expert in the history and theory of tourism. In this connection, he stresses the romantic character of the tourist consumption and classifies tourist travel as "time travel aback" and, drawing on Reinhart Koselleck and Michel Foucault, the touristic space as "chronotopia". Further well-known works are on the history and structures of alcohol use and misuse, including the phenomenon of addiction which he regards as a social construction reflecting the need for self control in modern societies. His book on the Power of Drunkenness is held at least in 189 libraries. Spode also worked on labour disputes, tobacco consumption and other historical and political topics.

Bibliography a) selected books
Alkohol und Zivilisation (Alcohol and Civilisation), Berlin: Tara 1991.
Zur Sonne, zur Freiheit! Beiträge zur Tourismusgeschichte (Contributions to Tourism History), Berlin: Unikom 1991 (editor).
Statistik der Arbeitskämpfe in Deutschland (Statistics of Labour Disputes in Germany), St. Katharinen: Scripta Mercaturae 1992 (together with H. Volkmann et al.).
Die Macht der Trunkenheit (The Power of Drunkenness), Opladen: Leske & Budrich (Springer) 1993.
Kreuzberg, Berlin: Nocolai 1994 (co-author).
Goldstrand und Teutonengrill. Kultur- und Sozialgeschichte des Tourismus in Deutschland. 1945 bis 1989 (Social and Cultural History of Tourism in Germany), Berlin: Unikom 1996 (editor).
Voyage. Studies on Travel and Tourism, Köln/Berlin: DuMont/Metropol 1997-2014 (yearbook editor)
Wie die Deutschen Reiseweltmeister wurden (How the Germans bcame Travel World Champions), Erfurt: Landeszentrale für politische Bildung 2003.
Die Zukunftsfähigkeit Deutschlands (Germany's Sustainability), Berlin: Wissenschaftszentrum Berlin 2006.
Ressource Zukunft. Die sieben Entscheidungsfelder der deutschen Reform (Future as a Resource), Farmington Hills: Budrich 2008.
Urlaub - Macht - Geschichte. Reisen und Tourismus in der DDR (Travel and Tourism in the GDR), Berlin: BeBra 2022.

Bibliography b) selected English articles
The First Step toward Sobriety: the „Boozing Devil“ in Sixteenth-Century Germany. In: Contemporary Drug Problems 21/1994.
World Health Organization (WHO). In: Jack S. Blocker et al. (eds.): Alcohol and Temperance in Modern History. An International Encyclopedia, Santa Barbara: ABC-Clio 2003.
Fordism, Mass Tourism and the Third Reich: the "Strength through Joy" Seaside Resort as an Index Fossil. In: Journal of Social History 38/2004. 
"Let Us Fly Where the Sun is": Air Travel and Tourism in Historical Perspective. In: Jochen Eisenbrand (ed.): Airworld, Weil: Vitra Design Museum 2004
Quantitative Aspects of "Kraft durch Freude" Tourism, 1934-1939. In: Margarita Ditsas (ed.): European Tourism and Culture, Athens: Livanis 2007.
Tourism Research and Theory in German-Speaking Countries. In: Graham M.S. Dann/Giuli Liebman-Parrinello (eds.): The Sociology of Tourism, Bingeley: Emarald 2009.
Alcohol consumption. In: Encyclopaedia of Early Modern History, vol. 1, Leiden/Boston: Brill 2016.
Mapping Leisure and Tourism through the Ages. In: Ishwar Modi/Teus Kamphorst (eds.): Leisure and Life through the Ages, Jaipur: Rawat 2017. 
Luxury in a Changing Sociocultural Environment. In: Roland Conrady et al. (eds.): Luxury Tourism, Cham: Springer 2020.
Traveling into the Abyss: Kraft durch Freude in the Third Reich. In: Ekatarina Degot/David Riff (eds.): A Pleaseant Apocalypse, Berlin: Hatje-Cantz 2020
Semiotics and Tourism. In: Jafar Jafari/Xiao Hongen (eds.): Encyclopedia of Tourism, new ed., Cham: Springer 2022.

References

External links
 Entry in Clio-online

1951 births
Living people
20th-century German historians
German sociologists
German male non-fiction writers
21st-century German historians
Academic staff of the University of Hanover